This is a list of notable individuals and organizations who voiced their endorsement of Cory Booker's campaign for the Democratic Party's nomination for the 2020 U.S. presidential election.

Federal legislative officials

U.S. Senators

Current
 Bob Menendez, U.S. Senator from New Jersey since 2006; former U.S. Representative from NJ-13 (1993–2006)

U.S. Representatives

Current
 Donald Norcross, U.S. Representative from NJ-01 since 2014
 Jeff Van Drew, U.S. Representative from NJ-02 since 2019 (switched endorsement to President Donald Trump)
 Andy Kim, U.S. Representative from NJ-03 since 2019 (endorsed Pete Buttigieg after Booker withdrew from the race)
 Josh Gottheimer, U.S. Representative from NJ-05 since 2017 (endorsed Mike Bloomberg after Booker withdrew from the race)
 Frank Pallone, U.S. Representative from NJ-06 since 1988; candidate for U.S. Senate in 2013
 Tom Malinowski, U.S. Representative from NJ-07 since 2019 (endorsed Joe Biden after Booker withdrew from the race)
 Albio Sires, U.S. Representative from NJ-08 since 2006
 Bill Pascrell, U.S. Representative from NJ-09 since 1997
 Donald Payne Jr., U.S. Representative from NJ-10 since 2012 (endorsed Joe Biden after Booker withdrew from the race)
 Mikie Sherrill, U.S. Representative from NJ-11 since 2019 (endorsed Mike Bloomberg after Booker withdrew from the race)
 Bonnie Watson Coleman, U.S. Representative from NJ-12 since 2015

State officials

Governors

Current
 Phil Murphy, Governor of New Jersey since 2018

Lieutenant Governors

Current
 Sheila Oliver, Lieutenant Governor of New Jersey since 2018

State executive officials

Current
 Tom DeGise, Hudson County Executive since 2002
 Joseph N. DiVincenzo Jr., Essex County Executive since 2003
 Brian Hughes, Mercer County Executive since 2004
 Benny Napoleon, Sheriff of Wayne County, Michigan since 2009
 James Tedesco, Bergen County Executive since 2015

State legislators

Current
 Lester Jackson, Georgia State Senator from District 2 since 2009
 David Dreyer, Georgia State Representative from District 59 since 2017
 Charlie McConkey, Iowa State Representative from District 15 since 2019 (endorsed Amy Klobuchar after Cory Booker withdrew from the race)
 Heather Matson, Iowa State Representative from District 38 since 2019 (endorsed Elizabeth Warren after Booker withdrew from the race)
 Jennifer Konfrst, Iowa State Representative from District 43 since 2019 (endorsed Elizabeth Warren after Booker withdrew from the race)
 Kenan Judge, Iowa State Representative from District 44 since 2019
 Beth Wessel-Kroeschell, Iowa State Representative from District 45 since 2005 (endorsed Elizabeth Warren after Booker withdrew from the race)
 Mark Smith, Iowa State Representative from District 71 since 2001 and former Minority Leader of the Iowa House of Representatives (2013–2019) (endorsed Joe Biden after Booker withdrew from the race)
 Amy Nielsen, Iowa State Representative from District 77 since 2017 (endorsed Joe Biden after Booker withdrew from the race)
 Monica Kurth, Iowa State Representative from District 89 since 2017 (endorsed Amy Klobuchar after Booker withdrew from the race)
 Selena Torres, Nevada Assemblywoman from District 3 since 2018 (co-endorsed Castro, who dropped out first; Torres endorsed Joe Biden after Booker withdrew from the race)
 David H. Watters, New Hampshire State Senator from District 4 since 2012; former New Hampshire State Representative from Stafford's 4th District (2008–2012) (endorsed Deval Patrick after Booker withdrew from the race)
 Martha Hennessey, New Hampshire State Senator from District 5 since 2016 (endorsed Pete Buttigieg after Booker withdrew from the race)
 Jon Morgan, New Hampshire State Senator for District 23 since 2018
 Jacqueline Cali-Pitts, New Hampshire State Senator for Rockingham District 30 since 1998 (endorsed Joe Biden after Booker withdrew from the race)
 Anita Burroughs, New Hampshire State Representative from the Carroll 1 District since 2018 (endorsed Joe Biden after Booker withdrew from the race) 
 Bruce Tatro, New Hampshire State Representative from the Cheshire District 15 since 2010
 Roger Dontonville, New Hampshire State Representative from Grafton District 10 since 2016
 Donald Bouchard, New Hampshire State Representative from Hillsborough District 11 since 2018
 Peter Leishman, New Hampshire State Representative from various districts (1996–2002), from Hillsborough District 6 (2006–2008), Hillsborough District 3 (2008–2010) and Hillsborough District 24 since 2011
 Patricia Klee, New Hampshire State Representative from Hillsborough District 30 since 2016
 Latha Mangipudi, New Hampshire State Representative from Hillsborough District 35 since 2013 (endorsed Amy Klobuchar after Booker withdrew from the race)
 Christy Bartlett, New Hampshire State Representative from Merrimack District 19 since 2012
 Katherine Rogers, New Hampshire State Representative from the Merrimack 28 District since 2012
 Kate Murray, New Hampshire State Representative from Rockingham District 24
 Jeffrey Salloway, New Hampshire State Representative from the Strafford District 5 since 2016 (endorsed Elizabeth Warren after Booker withdrew from the race)
 Timothy Horrigan, New Hampshire State Representative from Strafford District 6 since 2010
 Linn Opderbecke, New Hampshire State Representative from the Strafford District 15 since 2016 (endorsed Amy Klobuchar after Booker withdrew from the race)
 Gerri Cannon, New Hampshire State Representative from the Strafford District 18 since 2018
 Cecilia Rich, New Hampshire State Representative from the Strafford District 18 since 2018 (endorsed Bernie Sanders after Booker withdrew from the race)
 Lee Walker Oxenham, New Hampshire State Representative from the Sullivan 1 District since 2014 (endorsed Elizabeth Warren after Booker withdrew from the race)
 John Knowles, former New Hampshire State Representative from Hillsborough District 27 (2006–2010)
 Stephen M. Sweeney, New Jersey State Senator from District 3 since 2002; President of the Senate since 2010
 Fred H. Madden, New Jersey State Senator from District 4 since 2004
 James Beach, New Jersey State Senator from District 6 since 2009
 Nicholas Scutari, New Jersey State Senator from District 22 since 2004
 Craig Coughlin, New Jersey Assemblyman from District 19 since 2010; Speaker of the Assembly since 2018
 Leola Robinson-Simpson, South Carolina State Representative from District 25 since 2013 (endorsed Tom Steyer after Booker withdrew from the race)
 John Richard C. King, South Carolina State Representative from District 49 since 2009
 Davis Crowley, Wisconsin State Representative from District 17 since 2016

Former
 Nate Willems, former Iowa State Representative from District 29 (2009–2013) (Previously endorsed Beto O'Rourke; endorsed Biden after Booker withdrew from the race)
 Katie Wheeler, former New Hampshire State Senator for District 21 (1996–2002); former New Hampshire State Representative (1988–1996)
 Ben Nesselhuf, former South Dakota State Senator from District 17 (2005–2011) and former South Dakota State Representative from District 17 (2001–2005); former Chair of the South Dakota Democratic Party (2011–2013)

Local and municipal officials

Mayors

Current
 Ras Baraka, Mayor of Newark, New Jersey since 2014
 Jim Bouley, Mayor of Concord, New Hampshire since 2008
 Courtney Clarke, Mayor of Waukee, Iowa since 2020
 Terrence Culbreath, Mayor of Johnston, South Carolina since 2014
 Gregory Ginyard, Mayor of Jenkinsville, South Carolina
 Julia Nelson, Mayor of Manning, South Carolina since 2011
 Terence Roberts, Mayor of Anderson, South Carolina since 2006 (endorsed Pete Buttigieg after Booker withdrew from the race)
 Bruce Teague, Mayor of Iowa City, Iowa since 2020 (endorsed Pete Buttigieg after Booker withdrew from the race)
 Harold Thompson, Mayor of Union, South Carolina

Former
 Samuel Murray, Mayor of Port Royal, South Carolina (1995–2019)

Municipal legislators

Current
 Mildred Crump, Newark City Council president from 2006 to 2010 and from 2013
 Carlos Gonzalez, Newark City Council member from 2006 to 2010 and from 2013
 Pamela Goynes-Brown, North Las Vegas, Nevada city council member from District 2 since 2011
 John Sharpe James, Newark City Council member since 2013
 Joe McCallum, Newark City Council member from 2014
 LaMonica McIver, Newark City Council member from 2018
 Eddie Osbourne, Newark City Council member from 2014
 Luis A. Quintana, At-large Newark, New Jersey City Councilman 1994–2013 and since 2014; former Mayor (2013–2014)
 Anibal Ramos, Newark City Council member from 2006

Former
 Theron Goynes, former North Las Vegas, Nevada city council member (1979–1997), president pro tempore of the council (1985–1997)

Party officials

Current
 Nikki Ford Barnes, DNC member
 Clay N. Middleton, DNC member
 Khary Penebaker, DNC member (endorsed Michael Bloomberg after Booker with drew from the race)
 Melinda Jones, member of the Iowa Democratic Party State Central Committee; former Chair of the Wapello County, Iowa Democratic Party
 Bryce Smith, Chairman of the Dallas County, Iowa Democratic Party
 Michelle Smith, Chairwoman of the Jasper County, Iowa Democratic Party
 Joe Andal, Burlington County, New Jersey Democratic Party chair since 2010
 Jerry Crawford, attorney, former chair of the Polk County, Iowa Democratic Party, and Democratic campaign operative
 Dave Brown, Chairman of the Monmouth County, New Jersey Democratic Party since 2017
 John Currie, Chairman of the New Jersey Democratic Party
 Steve Errickson, Chairman of the Cumberland County, New Jersey Democratic Party since 2018
 Steve Caltaiano, Salem County, New Jersey Democratic Party chair since 2008
 Amy DeGise, Hudson County, New Jersey Democratic Party chair since 2018
 Wyatt Earp, Ocean County, New Jersey Democratic Party chair since 2005
 LeRoy J. Jones Jr., Chairman of the Essex County, New Jersey Democratic Party
 Kevin McCabe, Middlesex County, New Jersey Democratic Party chair since 2013
 Janice Mironov, Mercer County, New Jersey Democratic Party chair since 2018
 Chip Morrison, Morris County, New Jersey Democratic Party chair since 2014
 Tom Palmieri, Warren County, New Jersey Democratic Party chair since 2013
 Arlenes Quinones Perez, Chairwoman of the Hunterdon County, New Jersey Democratic Party since 2006
 Brendan Sciarra, Cape May County, New Jersey Democratic Party chair since 2017
 Marguerite Schaffer, Somerset County, New Jersey Democratic Party chair since and DNC member from 2008 at the latest
 Mike Suleiman, Atlantic County, New Jersey Democratic Party chair since 2016

Former
 Joan Amos, former Lucas County, Iowa Democratic Party Chair (previously endorsed John Delaney)
 David Betsworth, former Warren County, Iowa Democratic Party Chair
 Julie Stewart, former Dallas County, Iowa Democratic Party Chair
 Paul Drager, former Chair of the Somersworth, New Hampshire Democratic Party
 Leslie Huhn, former Sussex County, New Jersey Democratic Party chair (2015–2019)
 Lou Stellato, former Bergen County, New Jersey Democratic Party chair (2011–2019)
 Christale Spain, former Executive Director of the South Carolina Democratic Party (2016–?)

Individuals

 Jon Bon Jovi, American singer and musician
 Rosario Dawson, actress (endorsed Bernie Sanders after Cory Booker withdrew from the race)
 Tammy Murphy, banker; First Lady of New Jersey since 2018

Notes

References

Cory Booker
Booker, Cory
Booker, Cory